Camp Molloy was a Norwegian Reality TV series that aired on TV3 during the spring of 2003 and was hosted by Ole Andre Sivertsen.

About the show
The series premiered on 3 March 2003 and aired from Monday to Thursday. There was 60 episodes and 17 contestants. Two winners would get  each. The show was set in the Australian wilderness.

Ratings
TV3 had high hopes for this show, but the show flopped with an average rating of only 69,000 viewers.

External links
Strix Televisjon
Filmfront.no

TV3 (Norway) original programming
Norwegian reality television series
2003 Norwegian television series debuts
2003 Norwegian television series endings
2000s Norwegian television series